Doomtree is an American hip hop collective and record label based in Minneapolis, Minnesota. The collective has seven members: Dessa, Cecil Otter, P.O.S, Sims, Mike Mictlan, Paper Tiger, and Lazerbeak. The collective is known for incorporating a wide range of musical influences into their work with lyrical complexity and wordplay, and their annual "Doomtree Blowout" events held in Minneapolis venues to showcase their group performances and the Twin Cities music scene.

Early years
The name "Doomtree" is a made-up word that doesn't have a meaning, according to P.O.S, who says that it has come to represent "my people and my life's work so far." When Dessa was asked about the name, she said "Initially it was a proposed name for a Cecil and P.O.S. record. The name followed us when we all lived together in a big rundown house a few years ago. Whether it was the fault of architecture or some sort of cosmic wormhole, dead pigeons always showed up on our doorstep." The group was originally named "False Hopes" when it was just P.O.S and Cecil Otter, but after consideration, it was traded off to be the name of a series of releases (there are 15 total) by Doomtree members (such as Cecil Otter's or Doomtree's debut).

Members of Doomtree have described the group's formation as a gradual process. The initial lineup saw P.O.S and MK Larada, friends from high school, making songs with other local artists such as Cecil Otter and Beautiful Bobby Gorgeous. The beginning of the name began when P.O.S and Cecil Otter first envisioned Doomtree to be an in house production team. Soon enough Sims and Lazerbeak, fellow Hopkins High School alumni, followed. Mike Mictlan, having also attended high school with P.O.S, became an official member when he moved back to Minneapolis from Los Angeles. Dessa joined after having a chance encounter with P.O.S, who was living down the street from her at the time along with Sims, Turbo Nemesis and MK Larada. Sims and Dessa were said to be the last to join the collective. After its final formation, members MK Larada, Turbo Nemesis, Tom Servo, and Bobby Gorgeous gradually drifted away from the group. MK Larada is responsible for Doomtree's famous "Wings and Teeth" logo.

Musical career
Doomtree's first official album, Doomtree, was released on July 29, 2008.

Their second official album, No Kings, was released to critical acclaim on November 22, 2011.

In 2012, Time included Doomtree in the "11 Great Bands You Don't Know (But Should)" list. December 12, 2012 was proclaimed by Mayor R. T. Rybak as "Doomtree Day in the city of Minneapolis" in conjunction with the opening night of the Doomtree Blowout 8 show at First Avenue.

Doomtree's documentary film, Team the Best Team, was also released as a DVD in 2012, and also as a digital stream and download in 2013.

In December 2014, Doomtree had the final installment of the annual Blowout concert series, which the crew hosted for 10 years.

On January 27, 2015, Doomtree released their third group album, All Hands. In October 2015, Doomtree curated the first Doomtree Zoo festival at the CHS Field.

Distribution
While P.O.S and Cecil Otter have released solo albums on other record labels (Rhymesayers Entertainment and Strange Famous Records, respectively), each of the group albums and the majority of the collective's solo work are released on their own label, Doomtree Records.

Doomtree has also formed a publisher, Doomtree Press. In 2009, it put out Spiral Bound, Dessa's first book of poetry and fiction.

Officially, the CEO of the label is Dessa, but the label is run by the entire group, with outside help from friends such as Ander Other, Doomtree's "Intern/Merchant/Graphic Designer/Webmaster/Video Editor/Social Media Agent/Librarian."

Style
As a group, Doomtree's sound reflects being a collective of many members with unique individual musical influences. Officially classified as hip-hop, the influences of jazz, punk rock, blues, rock, and soul can be detected throughout their music. Doomtree is known for having "tangled, multihued and pointedly intellectualized lyrics" with "cerebral rhymes and moody beats."

Honors and awards
The group has been honored with a star on the outside mural of the Minneapolis nightclub First Avenue, recognizing performers that have played sold-out shows or have otherwise demonstrated a major contribution to the culture at the iconic venue. P.O.S also has a star for his solo work. Receiving a star "might be the most prestigious public honor an artist can receive in Minneapolis," according to journalist Steve Marsh.

Members

Current
 Dessa: rapper
 Cecil Otter: rapper/producer
 P.O.S: rapper/producer
 Sims: rapper
 Mike Mictlan: rapper
 Paper Tiger: producer/DJ
 Lazerbeak: producer

Former
 MK Larada: producer
 Turbo Nemesis: producer/DJ
 Tom Servo: producer/DJ
 Beautiful Bobby Gorgeous: producer

Discography

Studio albums

EPs and mixtapes

Singles

Other

Doomtree Blowout

Between 2005-2014, Doomtree performed in annual group shows ("Blowouts") at local Minneapolis, Minnesota venues.

See also
 Underground hip hop
 Twin Cities hip hop
 List of record labels

References

External links

 

 
Alternative hip hop groups
Midwest hip hop groups
American independent record labels
Independent record labels based in Minnesota
Hip hop record labels
Companies based in Minneapolis
2001 establishments in Minnesota